Charles Blois may refer to:

Sir Charles Blois, 1st Baronet ( 1657 – 1738), British Tory politician
Charles of Blois (1319 – 1364) "the Saint", legalist Duke of Brittany
Sir Charles Blois, 2nd Baronet (1733–1760), of the Blois baronets
Sir Charles Blois, 3rd Baronet (1692–1761), of the Blois baronets
Sir Charles Blois, 6th Baronet (1766–1850), of the Blois baronets
Sir Charles Blois, 7th Baronet (1794–1855), of the Blois baronets
Sir Charles Nicholas Gervase Blois, 11th Baronet (born 1939), of the Blois baronets

See also
Blois (surname)